The Gardener's Clay Formation is a Pleistocene geologic unit straddling the New York-New Jersey border. Fossil fish vertebrae and teeth are preserved in its sediments.

Footnotes

References
 Hunt, ReBecca K., Vincent L. Santucci and Jason Kenworthy. 2006. "A preliminary inventory of fossil fish from National Park Service units." in S.G. Lucas, J.A. Spielmann, P.M. Hester, J.P. Kenworthy, and V.L. Santucci (ed.s), Fossils from Federal Lands. New Mexico Museum of Natural History and Science Bulletin 34, pp. 63–69.

Geologic formations of New York (state)
Geologic formations of New Jersey